Neidenbach is a municipality in the district of Bitburg-Prüm, in Rhineland-Palatinate, western Germany.

Geography 
Neidenbach lies about 45 km north of the city of Trier in the Kyllburger Waldeifel region. Within its municipality are the hamlet of Erntehof 2.5 km northwest of the village and the settlements of Koppenweg, Maierhof, Nickelshof and Am Wasserfall.

References

Bitburg-Prüm